The Horns is a public house in Datchworth, Hertfordshire, England.  It is situated on Bramfield Road in Bull's Green, a hamlet in the parish of Datchworth.

Architecture
The building has a timber frame on a brick base. It is Grade II listed and dates from the early sixteenth century.

References

External links

Grade II listed pubs in Hertfordshire
Timber framed pubs in Hertfordshire